is a Japanese television drama series based on a video game from DeNA. It premiered on TBS on 28 October 2011. The theme song of the series is Lock On by Yui.

Cast
 Tori Matsuzaka as Rei Kamimura 
 Aya Ōmasa as Karen Katagiri  
 Seiji Fukushi as Taiga Kishihara 
 Hwang Chan-sung as Jack 
 Nozomi Sasaki as Sister Snake 
 Hiroki Aiba as Kurata Keisuke
 Daisuke Kikuta as Shuhei Kazuki
 Teronosuke Takezai as Makato Mikami
 Atomu Shimojō as Yuji Nishizaki
 Kyōko Maya as Yoko Kitaba
 Tasuku Nagase as Ryota Kosugi

Additional Cast
 Shigemitsu Ogi as Seiya Nagura (ep.2)
 Tatsuhito Okuda as Yasumasa Takagi (ep.2)
 Kazue Itoh as Ritsuko Kusakabe (ep.3)
 Kazuma Suzuki as Kazuhiko Akagawa (ep.4)
 Mansaku Ikeuchi as Kento Hiruta (ep.5)
 Hiroshi Watari as Sotaro Batomura (ep.6)
 Rena Nōnen as Kaide Batomura (ep.6)
 Taro Suruga as Yuta Ito (ep.6)
 Kazuhiko Nishimura as Koshi Kitaba (ep.7)
 Shunsuke Ohe as young Rei Kamimura (ep.7)
 Himeka Asami as young Karen Katagiri (ep.7)
 Shinji Yamashita as Hideomi Todo (ep.8-9)
 Yui - ep.9

Characters
Rei Kamimura:
Main male character, doesn't have any memories from further than one year ago.
he is able to remember anything with one glance and is the brain of the team.

Karen Katagiri:
Important female character, doesn't have any memories from further than one year ago. she uses her charms to get men to tell her what she wants and is an expert at stealing something when somebody isn't paying attention.

Taiga Kishihara:
Important male character, doesn't have any memories from further than one year ago. he is the technological one of the group and handles anything from security to short distraction. he is a bit goofy and has a big crush on Karen.

References

External links
  

DeNA
DeNA franchises
Japanese drama television series
Japanese television shows based on video games
TBS Television (Japan) dramas
2011 Japanese television series debuts
2011 Japanese television series endings